Alstonia angustifolia is a species of plant in the family Apocynaceae. It is found in Indonesia, Malaysia, the Philippines, and Vietnam. It can be used to relieve headache.

References

angustifolia
Least concern plants
Taxonomy articles created by Polbot